Graham Alan Pointer (born 2 May 1967) is an English former first-class cricketer.

Pointer was born at Lewisham in May 1967. He was educated at St Dunstan's College, before going up to St John's College, Cambridge. While studying at Cambridge, he played first-class cricket for Cambridge University, making his debut against Essex in 1987. He played first-class cricket for Cambridge until 1990, making fifteen appearances. Playing primarily as a left-arm medium-fast bowler, he took 17 wickets in his fifteen matches for Cambridge, at an average of 74.88 and with best figures of 3 for 31. As a tailend batsman, he scored 231 runs at a batting average of 12.15 and with a high score of 33. In addition to playing first-class cricket for Cambridge, Pointer also made a single appearance for a combined Oxford and Cambridge Universities cricket team against the touring Pakistanis at Oxford in 1987.

References

External links

1967 births
Living people
People from Lewisham
People educated at St Dunstan's College
Alumni of St John's College, Cambridge
English cricketers
Cambridge University cricketers
Oxford and Cambridge Universities cricketers